Nation People Together (NOI) is a political party in Romania, founded on 13 January 2022 by Bogdan Petrescu, along with three other people. The party is largely associated with former president of the Social Democratic Party (PSD) and Prime Minister Viorica Dăncilă, who became NOI's president on 12 April 2022 on a 247–2 vote.

See also
 Politics of Romania

References

External links
 Official website (in Romanian)

Political parties in Romania
Political parties established in 2022
2022 establishments in Romania
Romanian nationalist parties
Nationalist parties in Romania